Margrave John V of Brandenburg-Salzwedel, nicknamed "the Illustrious" (in Latin Illustris), (1302 – 26 March 1317) was Margrave and co-ruler of Brandenburg from 1308 until his death.

His parents were Margrave Hermann, "the Tall" of Brandenburg and Anne of Austria, a daughter of Emperor Albert I, Duke of Austria and King of Bohemia.  John married Catherine (d. 1327), a daughter of Duke Henry III of Glogau and Sagan.

John V died in 1317.  With his death, the Brandenburg-Salzwedel line of the House of Ascania died out.

External links 
 Entry in the database of the University of Erlangen

Margraves of Brandenburg
House of Ascania
1302 births
1317 deaths
14th-century German nobility